Gilberto Martínez (24 March 1934 – 3 January 2017) was a Colombian swimmer. He competed in the men's 400 metre freestyle at the 1956 Summer Olympics, where he was eliminated in the heats.

References

External links
 

1934 births
2017 deaths
Colombian male swimmers
Olympic swimmers of Colombia
Swimmers at the 1956 Summer Olympics
Competitors at the 1954 Central American and Caribbean Games
Central American and Caribbean Games gold medalists for Colombia
Place of birth missing
Central American and Caribbean Games medalists in swimming
Pan American Games medalists in swimming
Pan American Games bronze medalists for Colombia
Swimmers at the 1955 Pan American Games
Medalists at the 1955 Pan American Games
20th-century Colombian people
21st-century Colombian people